Rasvåg is a fishing village in Flekkefjord municipality in Agder county, Norway. The village is one of two harbours on the Norwegian island of Hidra.

References

Villages in Agder
Flekkefjord